The Aurora Regional Fire Museum is an educational institution located in Aurora, Illinois, USA. Its purpose is to preserve and exhibit the artifacts and history of fire departments in Aurora and the surrounding area, as well as to teach and promote fire safety and prevention. It has many interactive exhibits. 

The museum is located in the old Central Fire Station of Aurora, which was built in 1894.  It has bay windows, a decorative cornice, an "onion-dome" and was asserted to be 'a model of its kind' when it was completed.  It was used as a fire station until 1980.

Exhibits

Building

References

External links
 Aurora Regional Fire Museum
 Welcome to Aurora Regional Fire Museum

Defunct fire stations in Illinois
Firefighting museums in the United States
Museums in Kane County, Illinois
History museums in Illinois
Tourist attractions in Aurora, Illinois
Firefighting in Illinois